Ehlers–Danlos syndromes (EDS) are a group of 13 genetic connective-tissue disorders in the current classification, with the latest type discovered in 2018. Symptoms often include loose joints, joint pain, stretchy velvety skin, and abnormal scar formation. These may be noticed at birth or in early childhood. Complications may include aortic dissection, joint dislocations, scoliosis, chronic pain, or early osteoarthritis. 

EDS occurs due to variations of more than 19 genes that are present at birth. The specific gene affected determines the type of EDS. Some cases result from a new variation occurring during early development, while others are inherited in an autosomal dominant or recessive manner. Typically, these variations result in defects in the structure or processing of the protein collagen.

Diagnosis is often based on symptoms and confirmed by genetic testing or skin biopsy, but people may initially be misdiagnosed with hypochondriasis, depression, or chronic fatigue syndrome.

A cure is not yet known and treatment is supportive in nature. Physical therapy and bracing may help strengthen muscles and support joints. Some forms of EDS result in a normal life expectancy, but those that affect blood vessels generally decrease it.

The hypermobile type of EDS (hEDS) affects at least one in 5,000 people globally; other types occur at lower frequencies. The prognosis depends on the specific disorder. Excess mobility was first described by Hippocrates in 400 BC. The syndromes are named after two physicians, Edvard Ehlers and Henri-Alexandre Danlos, who described them at the turn of the 20th century.

Types 
In 2017, 13 subtypes of EDS were classified using specific diagnostic criteria. According to the Ehlers–Danlos Society, the syndromes can also be grouped by the symptoms determined by specific gene mutations. Group A disorders are those that affect primary collagen structure and processing. Group B disorders affect collagen folding and crosslinking. Group C are disorders of structure and function of myomatrix. Group D disorders are those that affect glycosaminoglycan biosynthesis. Group E disorders are characterized by defects in the complement pathway. Group F are disorders of intracellular processes, and Group G is considered to be unresolved forms of EDS.

Hypermobile EDS (hEDS)
Hypermobile EDS (hEDS, formerly categorized as type 3) is mainly characterized by hypermobility that affects both large and small joints. It may lead to frequent joint subluxations (partial dislocations) and dislocations. In general, people with this variant have skin that is soft, smooth, and velvety and bruises easily, and may have chronic muscle and/or bone pain. It affects the skin less than other forms. It has no available genetic test. hEDS is the most common of the 19 types of connective tissue disorders. Since no genetic test exists, providers have to diagnose hEDS based on what they know about the condition and the patient's physical attributes. Other than the general signs, attributes can include faulty connective tissues throughout the body, musculoskeletal issues, and family history. Along with these general signs and side effects, patients can have trouble healing.

Women who are pregnant should be warned about things such as pre-labor rupture of membranes, drop in blood pressure with anesthesia, precipitate birth (very fast, active labor), malposition of bleeding, and more. New mothers with hEDS should pay extra attention to taking care of their babies. Mothers may have trouble taking care of babies because of the risk of dropping a baby due to weak connective tissue in arms and legs, falling, postpartum depression (more than the general population), and healing from the birthing process.

The Medical University of South Carolina discovered a gene variant common with hEDS patients.

Genetics of Hypermobile EDS

While 12 of the 13 subtypes of EDS have genetic variations that can be tested for by genetic testing, there is no known genetic cause of hEDS. Recently, several labs and research initiatives have been attempting to uncover a potential hEDS gene. In 2018, the Ehlers–Danlos Society began the Hypermobile Ehlers–Danlos Genetic Evaluation (HEDGE) study. The ongoing study has screened over 1,000 people who have been diagnosed with hEDS by the 2017 criteria to evaluate their genome for a common mutation. To date, 200 people with hEDS have had whole genome sequencing, and 500 have had whole exome sequencing; this study aims to increase those numbers significantly.

Promising outcomes of this increased screening have been reported by the Norris Lab, led by Russell Norris, in the Department of Regenerative Medicine and Cell Biology at Medical University of South Carolina. Using CRISPR Cas-9 mediated genome editing on mouse models of the disease, the lab has recently identified a "very strong candidate gene" for hEDS. This finding, and a greater understanding of cardiac complications associated with the majority of EDS subtypes, has led to the development of multiple druggable pathways involved in aortic and mitral valve diseases. While this candidate gene has not been publicly identified, the Norris lab has conducted several studies involving small population genome sequencing and come up with a working list of possible hEDS genes. A mutation in COL3A1 in a single family with autosomal dominant hEDS phenotype was found to cause reduced collagen secretion and an over-modification of collagen. In 35 families, copy number alterations in TPSAB1, encoding alpha-tryptase, were associated with increased basal serum tryptase levels, associated with autonomic dysfunction, gastrointestinal disorders, allergic and cutaneous symptoms, and connective tissue abnormalities, all concurrent with hEDS phenotype. Lastly, Tenascin X, an extracellular matrix protein important for collagen mutation encoded by the TNXB gene, has been associated with hEDS in patients with Tenascin X deficiency.

Another way the Norris lab is attempting to find this gene is by looking at genes involved in the formation of the aorta and mitral valves, as these valves are often prolapsed or malformed as a symptom of EDS. Because hEDS is such a complex, multi-organ disease, focusing on one hallmark trait has proven successful. One gene found this way is DZIP1, which regulates cardiac valve development in mammals through a CBY1-beta-catenin mechanism. Mutations at this gene affect the beta-catenin cascade involved in development, causing malformation of the extracellular matrix, resulting in loss of collagen. A lack of collagen here is both consistent with hEDS and explains the "floppy" mitral and aortic valve heart defects. A second genetic study specific to mitral valve prolapse focused on the PDGF signaling pathway, which is involved in growth factor ligands and receptor isoforms. Mutations in this pathway affect the ability to localize cilia in various cell types, including cardiac cells. With the resulting ciliopathies, structures such as the cardiac outflow tract, heart tube assembly, and cardiac fusion are limited and/or damaged.

Classical EDS (cEDS)
Classical EDS (formerly categorized as type 1) is characterized by extremely elastic skin that is fragile and bruises easily and hypermobility of the joints. Molluscoid pseudotumors (calcified hematomas that occur over pressure points) and spheroids (cysts that contain fat occurring over forearms and shins) are also often seen. A side complication of the hyperelasticity presented in many EDS cases makes wounds closing on their own more difficult. Sometimes, motor development is delayed and hypotonia occurs. The variation causing this type of EDS is in the genes COL5A2, COL5A1, and less frequently COL1A1. It involves the skin more than hEDS. In classical EDS, large variation in symptom presentation is seen. Because of this variance, EDS has often been underdiagnosed. Without genetic testing, healthcare professionals may be able to provide a provisional diagnosis based on careful examination of the mouth, skin, and bones, as well as by neurological assessment. 

A good way to begin the diagnosis process is looking at family history. EDS is an autosomal dominant condition, so is often inherited from parents. Genetic testing remains the most reliable way to diagnose EDS. No cure for type 1 EDS has been found, but a course of non-weight-bearing exercise can help with muscular tension, which can help correct some EDS symptoms. Anti-inflammatory drugs and lifestyle changes can help with joint pain. Lifestyle choices should also be made with children who have EDS to try to prevent wounds to the skin. Protective garments can help with this. In a wound, deep stitches are often used and left in place for longer than normal.

Vascular EDS (vEDS)
Vascular EDS (formerly categorized as type 4) is identified by skin that is thin, translucent, extremely fragile, and bruises easily. It is also characterized by fragile blood vessels and organs that can easily rupture. Affected people are frequently short, and have thin scalp hair. It also has characteristic facial features, including large eyes, an undersized chin, sunken cheeks, a thin nose and lips, and ears without lobes. Joint hypermobility is present, but generally confined to the small joints (fingers, toes). Other common features include club foot, tendon and/or muscle rupture, acrogeria (premature aging of the skin of the hands and feet), early-onset varicose veins, pneumothorax (collapse of a lung), the recession of the gums, and a decreased amount of fat under the skin. It can be caused by the variations in the COL3A1 gene. Rarely, COL1A1 variations can also cause it.

Kyphoscoliosis EDS (kEDS)
Kyphoscoliosis EDS (formerly categorized as type 6) is associated with severe hypotonia at birth, delayed motor development, progressive scoliosis (present from birth), and scleral fragility. People may also have easy bruising, fragile arteries that are prone to rupture, unusually small corneas, and osteopenia (low bone density). Other common features include a "marfanoid habitus" characterized by long, slender fingers (arachnodactyly), unusually long limbs, and a sunken chest (pectus excavatum) or protruding chest (pectus carinatum). It can be caused by variations in the gene PLOD1, or rarely, in the FKBP14 gene.

Arthrochalasia EDS (aEDS)
Arthrochalasia EDS (formerly categorized as types 7A and B) is characterized by severe joint hypermobility and congenital hip dislocation. Other common features include fragile, elastic skin with easy bruising, hypotonia, kyphoscoliosis (kyphosis and scoliosis), and mild osteopenia. Type-I collagen is usually affected. It is very rare, with about 30 cases reported. It is more severe than the hypermobility type. Variations in the genes COL1A1 and COL1A2 cause it.

Dermatosparaxis EDS (dEDS)
Dermatosparaxis EDS (formerly categorized as type 7C) is associated with extremely fragile skin leading to severe bruising and scarring; saggy, redundant skin, especially on the face; hypermobility ranging from mild to serious; and hernias. Variations in the ADAMTS2 gene cause it. It is extremely rare, with around 11 cases reported.

Brittle-cornea syndrome (BCS)
Brittle-cornea syndrome is characterized by the progressive thinning of the cornea, early-onset progressive keratoglobus or keratoconus, nearsightedness, hearing loss, and blue sclerae. Classic symptoms, such as hypermobile joints and hyperelastic skin, are also seen often. It has two types. Type 1 occurs due to variations in the ZNF469 gene. Type 2 is due to variations in the PRDM5 gene.

Classical-like EDS (clEDS)
Classical-like EDS is characterized by skin hyperextensibility with velvety skin texture and absence of atrophic scarring, generalized joint hypermobility with or without recurrent dislocations (most often shoulder and ankle), and easily bruised skin or spontaneous ecchymoses (discolorations of the skin resulting from bleeding underneath). It can be caused by variations in the TNXB gene.

Spondylodysplastic EDS (spEDS)
Spondylodysplastic EDS is characterized by short stature (progressive in childhood), muscle hypotonia (ranging from severe congenital to mild later-onset), and bowing of limbs. It can be caused by variations in both copies of the B4GALT7 gene. Other cases can be caused by variations in the B3GALT6 gene. People with variations in this gene can have kyphoscoliosis, tapered fingers, osteoporosis, aortic aneurysms, and problems with the lungs. Other cases can be caused by the SLC39A13 gene. Those with variations in this gene have protuberant eyes, wrinkled palms of the hands, tapering fingers, and distal joint hypermobility.

Musculocontractural EDS (mcEDS)
Musculocontractural EDS is characterized by congenital multiple contractures, characteristically adduction-flexion contractures and/or talipes equinovarus (clubfoot), characteristic craniofacial features, which are evident at birth or in early infancy, and skin features such as skin hyperextensibility, bruising, skin fragility with atrophic scars, and increased palmar wrinkling. It can be caused by variations in the CHST14 gene. Some other cases can be caused by variations in the DSE gene.

Myopathic EDS (mEDS)
Myopathic EDS (mEDS) is characterized by three major criteria: congenital muscle hypotonia and/or muscle atrophy that improves with age, proximal joint contractures of the knee, hip, and elbow, and hypermobility of distal joints (ankles, wrists, feet, and hands). Four minor criteria may also contribute to a diagnosis of mEDS. This disorder can be inherited through either an autosomal dominant or an autosomal recessive pattern. Molecular testing must be completed to verify that mutations in the COL12A1 gene are present; if not, other collagen-type myopathies should be considered.

Periodontal EDS (pEDS)
Periodontal EDS (pEDS) is an autosomal-dominant disorder characterized by four major criteria of severe and intractable periodontitis of early-onset (childhood or adolescence), lack of attached gingiva, pretibial plaques, and family history of a first-degree relative who meets clinical criteria. Eight minor criteria may also contribute to the diagnosis of pEDS. Molecular testing may reveal mutations in C1R or C1S genes affecting the C1r protein.

Cardiac-valvular EDS (cvEDS)
Cardiac-valvular EDS (cvEDS) is characterized by three major criteria: severe progressive cardiac-valvular problems (affecting aortic and mitral valves), skin problems such as hyperextensibility, atrophic scarring, thin skin, and easy bruising, and joint hypermobility (generalized or restricted to small joints). Four minor criteria may aid in diagnosis of cvEDS. cvEDS is an autosomal recessive disorder, inherited through variation in both alleles of the gene COL1A2.

Signs and symptoms
This group of disorders affects connective tissues across the body, with symptoms most typically present in the joints, skin, and blood vessels. However, as connective tissue is found throughout the body, EDS may result in an array of unexpected impacts with any degree of severity, and the condition is not limited to joints, skin, and blood vessels. Effects may range from mildly loose joints to life-threatening cardiovascular complications. Due to the diversity of subtypes within the EDS family, symptoms may vary widely between individuals diagnosed with EDS.

Musculoskeletal 
Musculoskeletal symptoms include hyperflexible joints that are unstable and prone to sprain, dislocation, subluxation, and hyperextension. There can be an early onset of advanced osteoarthritis, chronic degenerative joint disease, swan-neck deformity of the fingers, and Boutonniere deformity of the fingers. Tearing of tendons or muscles may occur. Deformities of the spine, such as scoliosis (curvature of the spine), kyphosis (a thoracic hump), tethered spinal cord syndrome, craniocervical instability (CCI), and atlantoaxial instability may also be present. There can also be myalgia (muscle pain) and arthralgia (joint pain), which may be severe and disabling. Trendelenburg's sign is often seen, which means that when standing on one leg, the pelvis drops on the other side. Osgood–Schlatter disease, a painful lump on the knee, is common as well. In infants, walking can be delayed (beyond 18 months of age), and bottom-shuffling instead of crawling occurs.

Skin
The weak connective tissue causes abnormal skin. This may present as stretchy or in other types simply be velvet soft. In all types, some increased fragility occurs, but the degree varies depending on the underlying subtype. The skin may tear and bruise easily, and may heal with abnormal atrophic scars; atrophic scars that look like cigarette paper are a sign seen including in those whose skin might appear otherwise normal. In some subtypes, though not the hypermobile subtype, redundant skin folds occur, especially on the eyelids. Redundant skin folds are areas of excess skin lying in folds.

Other skin symptoms include molluscoid pseudotumors, especially on pressure points, petechiae, subcutaneous spheroids, livedo reticularis, and piezogenic papules are less common. In vascular EDS, skin can also be thin and translucent. In dermatosparaxis EDS, the skin is extremely fragile and saggy.

Cardiovascular
 Thoracic outlet syndrome
 Arterial rupture
 Valvular heart disease, such as mitral valve prolapse, creates an increased risk for infective endocarditis during surgery. This may progress to a life-threatening degree. Heart conduction abnormalities have been found in those with hypermobility form of EDS.
 Dilation and/or rupture (aneurysm) of ascending aorta
 Cardiovascular autonomic dysfunction such as postural orthostatic tachycardia syndrome
 Raynaud's phenomenon
 Varicose veins
 Heart murmur
 Heart conduction abnormalities

Other manifestations
 Hiatal hernia
 Gastroesophageal reflux
 Poor gastrointestinal motility
 Dysautonomia
 Gorlin's sign (touch tongue to nose)
 Anal prolapse
 Flat feet
 Tracheobronchomalacia / tracheal collapse
 Collapsed lung (spontaneous pneumothorax)
 Nerve disorders (carpal tunnel syndrome, acroparesthesia, neuropathy, including small fiber neuropathy)
 Insensitivity to local anesthetics
 Arnold–Chiari malformation
 Platelet aggregation failure (platelets do not clump together properly)
 Mast cell disorders (including mast cell activation syndrome and mastocytosis)
 Pregnancy complications: increased pain, mild to moderate peripartum bleeding, cervical insufficiency, uterine tearing, or premature rupture of membranes
 Hearing loss may occur in some types
 Eye: Nearsightedness, retinal tearing and retinal detachment, keratoconus, blue sclera, dry eye, Sjogren's syndrome, lens subluxation, angioid streaks, epicanthal folds, strabismus, corneal scarring, brittle cornea syndrome, cataracts, carotid-cavernous sinus fistulas, macular degeneration
 Craniocervical instability: caused by trauma(s) to the head and neck areas such as concussion and whiplash. Ligaments in neck are unable to heal properly, so the neck structure does not have the ability to support the skull, which can then sink into the brain stem, blocking the flow of cerebrospinal fluid, leading to issues related to the autonomic nervous system failing to work properly.
 Osteoporosis and osteopenia are associated with EDS and symptomatic joint hypermobility
 There is some evidence that EDS may be associated with greater than expected frequencies of neurodevelopmental disorders such as attention deficit hyperactivity disorder (ADHD) and other learning, communication and motor issues, including autism spectrum conditions and Tourette syndrome.

Because it is often undiagnosed or misdiagnosed in childhood, some instances of EDS have been mischaracterized as child abuse. The pain may also be misdiagnosed as a behavior disorder or Munchausen by proxy.

The pain associated with EDS ranges from mild to debilitating.

Causes 

Every type of EDS except the hypermobile type (which affects the vast majority of people with EDS) can be positively tied to specific genetic variation.

Variations in these genes can cause EDS:
 Collagen primary structure and collagen processing: ADAMTS2, COL1A1, COL1A2, COL3A1, COL5A1, COL5A2
 Collagen folding and collagen cross-linking: PLOD1, FKBP14
 Structure and function of myomatrix: TNXB, COL12A1
 Glycosaminoglycan biosynthesis: B4GALT7, B3GALT6, CHST14, DSE
 Complement pathway: C1R, C1S
 Intracellular processes: SLC39A13, ZNF469, PRDM5

Variations in these genes usually alter the structure, production, or processing of collagen or proteins that interact with collagen. Collagen provides structure and strength to connective tissue. A defect in collagen can weaken connective tissue in the skin, bones, blood vessels, and organs, resulting in the features of the disorder. Inheritance patterns depend on the specific syndrome.

Most forms of EDS are inherited in an autosomal dominant pattern, which means only one of the two copies of the gene in question must be altered to cause a disorder. A few are inherited in an autosomal recessive pattern, which means both copies of the gene must be altered for a person to be affected. It can also be an individual (de novo or "sporadic") variation. Sporadic variations occur without any inheritance.

Diagnosis 
A diagnosis can be made by an evaluation of medical history and clinical observation. The Beighton criteria are widely used to assess the degree of joint hypermobility. DNA and biochemical studies can help identify affected people. Diagnostic tests include collagen gene-variant testing, collagen typing via skin biopsy, echocardiogram, and lysyl hydroxylase or oxidase activity, but these tests are not able to confirm all cases, especially in instances of an unmapped variation, so clinical evaluation remains important. If multiple members of a family are affected, prenatal diagnosis may be possible using a DNA information technique known as a linkage study. Knowledge about EDS among all kinds of practitioners is poor. Research is ongoing to identify genetic markers for all types.

Differential diagnosis 
Several disorders share some characteristics with EDS. For example, in cutis laxa, the skin is loose, hanging, and wrinkled. In EDS, the skin can be pulled away from the body, but is elastic and returns to normal when let go. In Marfan syndrome, the joints are very mobile and similar cardiovascular complications occur. People with EDS tend to have a "marfanoid" appearance (e.g., tall, skinny, long arms and legs, "spidery" fingers), but physical appearance and features in several types of EDS also have characteristics including short stature, large eyes, and the appearance of a small mouth and chin, due to a small palate. The palate can have a high arch, causing dental crowding. Blood vessels can sometimes be easily seen through translucent skin, especially on the chest. The genetic connective tissue disorder Loeys–Dietz syndrome also has symptoms that overlap with EDS.

In the past, Menkes disease, a copper metabolism disorder, was thought to be a form of EDS. People are commonly misdiagnosed with fibromyalgia, bleeding disorders, or other disorders that can mimic EDS symptoms. Because of these similar disorders and complications that can arise from an unmonitored case of EDS, a correct diagnosis is important. Pseudoxanthoma elasticum is worth consideration in diagnosis.

Management 
No cure for Ehlers–Danlos syndromes is known, and treatment is supportive. Close monitoring of the cardiovascular system, physiotherapy, occupational therapy, and orthopedic instruments (e.g., wheelchairs, bracing, casting) may be helpful. This can help stabilize the joints and prevent injury. Orthopedic instruments are helpful for the prevention of further joint damage, especially for long distances. People should avoid activities that cause the joint to lock or overextend.

A physician may prescribe casting to stabilize joints. Physicians may refer a person to an orthotist for orthotic treatment (bracing). Physicians may also consult a physical and/or occupational therapist to help strengthen muscles and to teach people how to properly use and preserve their joints.

Aquatic therapy promotes muscular development and coordination. With manual therapy, the joint is gently mobilized within the range of motion and/or manipulations. If conservative therapy is not helpful, surgical joint repair may be necessary. Medication to decrease pain or manage cardiac, digestive, or other related conditions may be prescribed. To decrease bruising and improve wound healing, some people have responded to vitamin C. Medical care workers often take special precautions because of the sheer number of complications that tend to arise in people with EDS. In vascular EDS, signs of chest or abdominal pain are considered trauma situations.

Cannabinoids and medical marijuana have shown some efficacy in reducing pain levels.

In general, medical intervention is limited to symptomatic therapy. Before pregnancy, people with EDS should have genetic counseling and familiarize themselves with the risks pregnancy poses. Children with EDS should be given information about the disorder so they can understand why they should avoid contact sports and other physically stressful activities. Children should be taught that they should not demonstrate the unusual positions they can maintain due to loose joints, as this may cause early degeneration of the joints. Emotional support along with behavioral and psychological therapy can be useful. Support groups can be immensely helpful for people dealing with major lifestyle changes and poor health. Family members, teachers, and friends should be informed about EDS so they can accept and assist the child.

Pain management 
Successful treatment of chronic pain in EDS requires a multidisciplinary team. The ways to manage pain can be to modify pain management techniques used in the normal population. Chronic pain has two types. The first type is nociceptive, which is caused by an injury sustained to tissues. The second type is neuropathic pain, caused by abnormal signals by the nervous system. In most cases, the pain is an unequal mix of the two. Physiotherapy (exercise rehabilitation) can be helpful, especially stabilizing the core and the joints. Stretching exercises must be reduced to slow and gentle stretching to reduce the risks of dislocations or subluxations. Usable methods may include posture reeducation, muscle release, joint mobilization, trunk stabilization, and manual therapy for overworked muscles. Cognitive behavioural therapy is used in all chronic pain patients, especially those who have severe, chronic, life-controlling pain that is unresponsive to treatment. It had not been checked for efficiency in clinical trials. The state of pain management with EDS is considered insufficient.

Medications 
Nonsteroidal anti-inflammatory drugs (NSAIDs) may help if the pain is caused by inflammation. But long-term use of NSAIDs is often a risk factor for gastrointestinal, renal, and blood-related side effects. It can worsen symptoms of mast cell activation syndrome, a disease that may be associated with EDS. Acetaminophen can be used to avoid the bleeding-related side effects of NSAIDs.

Opioids have shown efficiency in some EDS cases for the management of both acute and chronic pain.  

Lidocaine can be applied topically after subluxations and painful gums. It can also be injected into painful areas in the case of musculoskeletal pain.

If the pain is neuropathic in origin, tricyclic antidepressants in low doses, anticonvulsants, and selective norepinephrine reuptake inhibitors can be used.

Dislocation and subluxation management
When a dislocation or subluxation does occur, muscle spasms and stress tend to occur, increasing pain and reducing the chances of the dislocation/subluxation naturally relieving. Methods to support a joint after such an incident include usage of a sling to hold the joint in place and allow it to relax. Orthopedic casts are not advised as there could be pain if unrelaxed muscles are still trying to spasm out against the cast. Other solutions to promote relaxation are heat, gentle massaging, and mental distractions.

Surgery 
The instability of joints, leading to subluxations and joint pain, often requires surgical intervention in people with EDS. Instability of almost all joints can happen, but appears most often in the lower and upper extremities, with the wrist, fingers, shoulder, knee, hip, and ankle being most common.

Common surgical procedures are joint debridement, tendon replacements, capsulorrhaphy, and arthroplasty. After surgery, the degree of stabilization, pain reduction, and people's satisfaction can improve, but surgery does not guarantee an optimal result; affected peoples and surgeons report being dissatisfied with the results. The consensus is that conservative treatment is more effective than surgery, particularly since people have extra risks of surgical complications due to the disease. Three basic surgical problems arise due to EDS – the strength of the tissues is decreased, which makes the tissue less suitable for surgery; the fragility of the blood vessels can cause problems during surgery; and wound healing is often delayed or incomplete. If considering surgical intervention, seeking care from a surgeon with extensive knowledge and experience in treating people with EDS and joint hypermobility issues would be prudent.

Local anesthetics, arterial catheters, and central venous catheters cause a higher risk of bruise formation in people with EDS. Some people with EDS also show a resistance to local anaesthetics. Resistance to lidocaine and bupivacaine is not uncommon, and mepivacaine tends to work better in people with EDS. Special recommendations for anesthesia are given for people with EDS. Detailed recommendations for anesthesia and perioperative care of people with EDS should be used to improve safety.

Surgery in people with EDS requires careful tissue handling and a longer immobilization afterward.

Prognosis 
The outcome for individuals with EDS depends on the specific type of EDS they have. Symptoms vary in severity, even in the same disorder, and the frequency of complications varies. Some people have negligible symptoms, while others are severely restricted in daily life. Extreme joint instability, chronic musculoskeletal pain, degenerative joint disease, frequent injuries, and spinal deformities may limit mobility. Severe spinal deformities may affect breathing. In the case of extreme joint instability, dislocations may result from simple tasks such as rolling over in bed or turning a doorknob. Secondary conditions such as autonomic dysfunction or cardiovascular problems, occurring in any type, can affect prognosis and quality of life. Severe mobility-related disability is seen more often in hEDS than in classical EDS or vascular EDS.

Although all types of EDS are potentially life-threatening, most people have a normal lifespan. Those with blood vessel fragility, though, have a high risk of fatal complications, including spontaneous arterial rupture, which is the most common cause of sudden death. The median life expectancy in the population with vascular EDS is 48 years.

Complications

Vascular 
 Pseudoaneurysm
 Vascular lesions (nature is disputed) due to tears in the lining of the arteries or deterioration of congenitally thin and fragile tissue
 Enlarged arteries

Gastrointestinal 
 A 50% risk of colonic perforation exists in Vascular Ehlers Danlos Syndrome.

Obstetric 
 Pregnancy increases the likelihood of uterine rupture.
 Maternal mortality is around 12%.
 Uterine hemorrhage can occur during the postpartum recovery.

Epidemiology 
Ehlers–Danlos syndromes are estimated to occur in about one in 5,000 births worldwide. Initially, prevalence estimates ranged from one in 250,000 to 500,000 people, but these were soon found to be low, as medical professionals became more adept at diagnosis. EDS may be far more common than the currently accepted estimate due to the wide range of severities with which the disorder presents.

The prevalence of the disorders differs dramatically. The most common is hypermobile EDS, followed by classical EDS. The others are very rare. For example, fewer than 10 infants and children with dermatosparaxis EDS have been described worldwide.

Some types of EDS are more common in Ashkenazi Jews. For example, the chance of being a carrier for dermatosparaxis EDS is one in 2,000 in the general population but one in 248 among Ashkenazi Jews.

History 
Until 1997, the classification system for EDS included 10 specific types and acknowledged that other extremely rare types existed. At this time, the classification system underwent an overhaul and was reduced to six major types using descriptive titles. Genetic specialists recognize that other types of this condition exist, but have only been documented in single families. Except for hypermobility (type 3), the most common type of all 10 types, some of the specific variations involved have been identified, and they can be precisely identified by genetic testing; this is valuable due to a great deal of variation in individual cases. Negative genetic test results, though, do not rule out the diagnosis, since not all of the variations have been discovered; therefore, the clinical presentation is very important.

Forms of EDS in this category may present with soft, mildly stretchable skin, shortened bones, chronic diarrhea, joint hypermobility and dislocation, bladder rupture, or poor wound healing. Inheritance patterns in this group include X-linked recessive, autosomal dominant, and autosomal recessive. Examples of types of related syndromes other than those above reported in the medical literature include:
 : type 5
 : type 8 – unspecified gene, locus 12p13
 : type 10 – unspecified gene, locus 2q34
 : Beasley–Cohen type
 : progeroid form – B4GALT7
 : type unspecified
 : D4ST1-deficient Ehlers–Danlos syndrome (adducted thumb-clubfoot syndrome) CHST14

Society and culture 

EDS may have contributed to the virtuoso violinist Niccolò Paganini's skill, as he was able to play wider fingerings than a typical violinist.

Many sideshow performers have EDS. Several of them were billed as the Elastic Skin Man, the India Rubber Man, and Frog Boy. They included such well-known individuals (in their time) as Felix Wehrle, James Morris, and Avery Childs. Two performers with EDS currently hold world records. Contortionist Daniel Browning Smith has hypermobile EDS and holds the current Guinness World Record for the most flexible man as of 2018, while Gary "Stretch" Turner, sideshow performer in the Circus Of Horrors, has held the current Guinness World Record for the most elastic skin since 1999, for his ability to stretch the skin on his stomach 6.25 inches.

Notable cases 

 Actress Cherylee Houston has hypermobile EDS. She uses a wheelchair and was the first full-time disabled actress on Coronation Street
 Drag queen and winner of the 11th season of RuPaul's Drag Race Yvie Oddly
 Eric the Actor, a regular caller to The Howard Stern Show
 Actress and activist Jameela Jamil
 Writer and actress Lena Dunham
 Australian singer Sia
 Singer Halsey
 YouTuber and disability rights activist Annie Elainey
 Miss America 2020 Camille Schrier
 Deaf singer/songwriter Mandy Harvey
 Singer-songwriter, author and artist Martha Marlow
 Pornographic actress and writer Lorelei Lee
 Reality show contestant Trevor Jones, dead from the vascular form of the disorder
 Scrunchie creator Rommy Hunt Revson, dead from a ruptured aorta 
 Japanese voice actress and singer Tomori Kusunoki

Other species 
Ehlers–Danlos-like syndromes have been shown to be hereditary in Himalayan cats, some domestic shorthair cats, and certain breeds of cattle. It is seen as a sporadic condition in domestic dogs. It has a similar treatment and prognosis. Animals with the condition should not be bred, as the condition can be inherited.

Degenerative suspensory ligament desmitis is a similar condition seen in many breeds of horses. It was originally notated in the Peruvian Paso and thought to be a condition of overwork and older age, but it is being recognized in all age groups and all activity levels. It has been noted in newborn foals.

See also

 Hypermobility spectrum disorder

References

External links 

 
 
 

 
Abnormalities of dermal fibrous and elastic tissue
Collagen disease
Congenital disorders
Connective tissue diseases
Contortion
Disorders of fascia
Wikipedia medicine articles ready to translate
Syndromes in mammals